The William T. Hornaday Award was created in 1915 to recognize major contributions to and service in environmental conservation, and is one of the rarest awards available in Boy Scouting.  The Gold Medal was created in 1975 to honor adult Scouters with lifetime service of more than twenty years and lasting impact in multi-state regions, nationally, or internationally.  Though the 1975 statutes for the Gold Medal limit annual awards to no more than six recipients, only 64 people have been awarded the Gold Medal since its creation.  Previously, a few awards for lifetime merit were given in other, lower grades that are now exclusive to youth Scouts for their conservation efforts.  The William T. Hornaday Award Gold Badge was created in 2000 to recognize conservationists with lesser influential service of more than three years, to be awarded at the council level.  The following is a partial list of known Hornaday Award Gold Medal recipients who were recognized by the National Conservation Committee of the Boy Scouts of America for lifetime service in conservation.

Permanent Wild Life Protection Fund Medal / William T. Hornaday Award Medal (1915–1975)
 1917 – Margaret Olivia Sage (1828–1918) – for a lifetime of philanthropy and for establishing Marsh Island Wildlife Preserve, in Alabama
 1917 – Drew William Standrod (1858–1942) – for persuading the Idaho Legislature to pass laws protecting the sage grouse
 1917 – Dr. Thomas Calderwood Stephens (1876–1948) – Professor of Biology at Morningside College, Sioux City, Iowa; awarded for leadership in reintroducing quail and grouse to the Iowa ecosystem
 1917 – Aldo Leopold (1887–1948) – the "Father of Wildlife Ecology and Environmental Ethics"
 1919 - John M. Phillips (1861-1953) – conservationist and wildlife photographer who helped bring the Boy Scouts to the United States

William T. Hornaday Gold Medal (1975–2019) and BSA Distinguished Conservationist (2020-present) List from National Council Office, Year Based on Year Approved (2/10/2021)
 1982 – John F. Shanklin – for over 35 years conservation service with the National Park Service.  He was a forest inspector with the Civilian Conservation Corps for nine years prior to World War Two. He worked directly for the Secretary of the Interior as the director of forests through 1962, and for the last 20 years of his career as  assistant director for Federal coordination, Bureau of Outdoor Recreation.
 1984 - Earl Hensel
 1984 - Ray Boice
 1985 - Walter Wenzel
 1986 - Dr. Laurence Walker
 1986 - Daniel Poole
 1987 - Ronald Switzer 
 1988 – Jack Holmes Berryman – for fifty years of conservation service between various state and Federal agencies, and as the executive vice president of the International Association of Fish and Wildlife Agencies.  Berryman published over 200 works on conservation and was also a recipient of the US Department of the Interior’s Distinguished Service Award.
 1990 – Dr. J. William Shiner – for his career as professor of park and resource management at Slippery Rock University, PA, as Chairman of the Conservation Committee for five National Scout Jamborees, and his work as Chairman of the Blue Ridge Mountains Council Conservation Committee. 
 1991 - Marlene Lugg
 1991 – Harold Hill – for conservation work in Alabama
 1992 - Keith Grove
 1993 - R. Peterson
 1993 - James Johnson, Sr.
 1994 - Bill Getz
 1994 - Francis Cummings
 1995 - Patrick Aubuchon
 1996 - V. Stiles
 1997 - Dr. Thomas Richards, Los Padres Council
 1998 - Dan Nelson
 1998 - Gregory Hansen
 1998 - Roger Conant
 1999 - Thomas Birch, Cradle of Liberty Council
 2000 – James T. Spencer – Worked in conservation for over 30 years. He founded the "Trail Boss" program in 1971 and worked as a volunteer ranger in the Angeles National Forest.
 2000 - John Gilmore
 2000 - William Dickinson, National Capital Area Council
 2001 - L. Watres
 2001 - William Brookes
 2003 - Stewart Jacobson, Great Salt Lake Council
 2003 - Doug Blankinship, National Capital Area Council
 2004 - Carl Landon Diamond
 2004 - Charles Rutland
 2005 – Robert Sturtevant – "for teaching forestry in Ethiopia for the Peace Corps;" Fellow, Society of American Foresters and John Beale Memorial Award recipient: and "for work as a member of the Visiting Forester Committee, Philmont Scout Ranch"
 2005 - George Tabb, Jr.
 2006 - Donald Hansen 
 2007 – Dr. Jeffrey Marion – PhD. in Recreation Resources Management; "for his career as a professor of forest resources and environmental conservation, and as a founding member of the board of directors of Leave No Trace." He was awarded the William T. Hornaday Gold Badge by the Blue Ridge Mountains Council, 2006.
 2007 - Matthew W. Klope, Mount Baker Council
 2008 - David Bates
 2009 -  Bruce A. Winslow
 2009 - C. Ben Jelsema 
 2010 – Robert C. Birkby – former chief Scouter in Seattle and author of the 10th, 11th, and 12th editions of the Scout Handbook and the 4th and 5th editions of the Boy Scout Field Book
 2010 - Tim Beaty
 2011 - Clint Shock, Ore Ida Council
 2013 - Robert Sousa, Western Massachusetts Council
 2013 – Dr. Craig Murray – PhD. in Environmental Biostatics; Professor, Scoutmaster, Trail Boss, Hornaday Award Advisor, and Philmont Advisor
 2013 - Clark Guy, Old North State Council
 2013 - Glenn Chambers, Great Rivers Council
 2014 – Hugh Allen Newberry – for decades of conservation and environmental education through the Nevada State Parks system and the US Forest Service, and in Scouting. 
 2014 – Frank H. Wadsworth – for service in natural resource conservation, reforestation, and environmental education. 
 2017 – Larry Warlick – registered Scout and Scouter for over 70 years; Eagle Scout (1955); awarded "for his 30+ years in conservation service in North Carolina as a Wildlife Biologist"
 2017 – Richard N. Williams – PhD. in Conservation Biology, "for his work restoring fish habitat." He is Senior Conservation Advisor for the Fly Fishers International, and is Chairman of the Conservation Committee for the Ore-Idaho Council.  Williams’ Gold Medal was awarded on April 19, 2017. 
 2017 – Michael Huneke – for over 25 years’ service in the U.S. Forest Service, including his work as a Wildlands Firefighter and as the Forest Stewardship Program Coordinator, where he prepared more than 500 forest stewardship plans. Huneke also contributed to the 2016 edition of the Boy Scout Handbook and was the Chairman of the Conservation Trail at the 2017 National Jamboree. He was awarded the Gold Medal at the 2017 National Boy Scout Jamboree.
 2017 – William “Mike” Perkins – “for five decades of conservation work and dedication to the environment” in Tremonton, UT.  Perkins’ Gold Medal was awarded on July 27, 2017 during the National Boy Scout Jamboree.
 2017 - Daniel L. Coberly, Greater Alabama Council 
 2017 – Mark S. Anderson – 19-year Director of Program at Philmont Scout Ranch, "for passionate and exemplary dedication to conservation and environmental education through innovative programs that have impacted hundreds of thousands of our nation's young people." Anderson received his Gold Medal at his retirement ceremony at Philmont Scout Ranch on November 4, 2017.
 2018 - Edward Warner, Denver Area Council
 2018 - Dr. David L. Kulhavy, East Texas Area Council
 2018 - Leon E. App, Heart of Virginia Council. With over 55 years of conservation experience dating back to 1963, Mr. App worked for the Commonwealth of Virginia for 38 years, starting in 1966 as a Forester in the Virginia Department of Forestry and retiring in 2004 as the Deputy Director of the Virginia Department of Conservation and Recreation. Among other things, he helped create the Virginia Natural Heritage Program and drafted more than 100 pieces of significant conservation legislation for the Commonwealth of Virginia. Mr. App's Scouting achievements include Eagle Scout (1956), Explorer Silver Award (Type II, 1957), Silver Beaver Award (1990), and Outstanding Eagle Scout (2017).  As an adult leader, he has assisted over 1,200 Eagle Scouts as the local district Eagle Advancement Chair, since 1980. His Gold Medal was approved on March 21, 2018 and awarded on July 21, 2018.
 2018 – John J. Moriarty – for over twenty years work protecting amphibian and reptile species in the Upper Midwest.  Moriarty is a former Sea Scout, Quartermaster Award recipient, and adult volunteer.  He published six books on Minnesota’s native amphibians and reptiles, and is the senior manager of wildlife and acting director of natural resources management for the Three Rivers Park District in Minnesota. His Hornaday Gold Medal was approved in October 2018.`
 2019 - Gary Stolz, Chester County Council
 2019 - Rex Eric Hayes, Northeast Georgia Council, for his global leadership and education of our land and water sustaining a record of service for over 30 years in projects on 6 continents, 50 countries and 36 U. S. States. These projects affect hundreds of thousands of people and their future to consume contamination-free water while helping eliminate or control erosion. He is recognized as a global luminary and chairs or is president of organizations such as the Sustainability Management Association, the Southeastern Rainwater Catchment Association (SERCA), a Texas Rainwater Catchment Association (TRCA). 
 2019 - Herbert F. Darling, Jr., Greater Niagara Frontier Council

During 2020, the William T. Hornaday Gold Medal was transitioned to the BSA Distinguished Conservationist award.  All 3 Gold Medals approved in 2020 were awarded after this transition and were re-designated as the BSA Distinguished Conservationist award.

 2020 - Dr. William W. Bowerman, National Capital Area Council, for over 35 years of work on conservation of bald eagles and other birds of prey on five continents. He served for 18 years on the International Joint Commission, Great Lakes Science Advisory Board, including 3 years as United States Co-Chair.  Bowerman's Scouting achievements include Eagle Scout (1976), Vigil Honor (1978), NESA Outstanding Eagle Scout Award (2019), and Silver Beaver Award (2020).  He has served as an adult leader in Cub Scouts and Boy Scouts, including service at the District and Council levels.  He has been a professor at Clemson University and a Department Chair at the University of Maryland, and supervised over 35 graduate degrees.  He is a National Fellow of The Explorers Club.  His Hornaday Gold Medal was approved on February 10, 2020.
2020 - David G. Brickley, National Capital Area Council, for over 45 years service to national natural resource conservation as an elected official, civil servant and private citizen. As a Virginia House of Delegates member from 1976 to 1998, he was instrumental in promoting conservation in the state, and sponsored legislation creating Leesylvania State Park on the Potomac River; protecting this environmental and historic property from development.  As Director of the Virginia Department of Conservation and Recreation from 1998 to 2002, the Department was awarded in 2001 the National Gold Medal Award for the Best State Park System in America. In November 2001 his leadership as reported in the Virginia-Pilot newspaper resulted in Virginia and North Carolina signing the first-ever agreement to help restore the Albemarle and Pamlico sounds, which form the second-largest estuary in North America.  Mr. Brickley is the founder of the 1,300-mile September 11 National Memorial Trail connecting the three"9/11" memorials.  His Hornaday Gold Medal was approved on July 20, 2020.
Dr. Gary L. Miller, National Capital Area Council, for over 35 years of research in insect biology and systematics. A USDA research entomologist for 30 years, his work and expertise have major impact in regulatory decision making in protecting U.S. agriculture. Miller served as the former Research Leader of the USDA’s Systematic Entomology Laboratory. As a USDA research entomologist, he is also the curator of the Smithsonian’s National Aphid Collection. Miller's Scouting achievements include Eagle Scout (1973), National Award of Merit (2003), Silver Beaver Award (2013), and NESA Outstanding Eagle Scout Award (2020). He has served as an adult leader in Cub Scouts and Boy Scouts as well as the District level and on staff at several National Jamborees and a World Jamboree. His Hornaday Gold Medal was approved on October 26, 2020.

References

Horn
Environmental awards